

Review and events

Matches

Legend

Friendly matches

Preseason

Mid-season (fall)

Winter break

Mid-season (spring)

Tournaments

3-Städte-Turnier Uster
Game duration 45 min

Frankfurt Cup 2015
Game duration 2x10 min (indoor tournament)

Super League

Kickoff times are in CET

League results and fixtures

League table

Swiss Cup

Kickoff times are in CET

UEFA Champions League

Kickoff times are in CET

Qualifying rounds

UEFA Europa League

Kickoff times are in CET

Notes

Squad

Squad, matches played and goals scored

Last updated: 6 June 2015 

Note: Numbers in parenthesis denotes substitution appearances.

Players in italic left the club during the season

Transfers

Coaching staff

''

Sources

Grasshopper Club Zurich
Grasshopper Club Zurich
Grasshopper Club Zürich seasons